Palca District may refer to several districts in Peru:

 Palca District, Huancavelica
 Palca District, Lampa
 Palca District, Tacna
 Palca District, Tarma